Eversim is a French video game developer and publisher. Founded in 2004, after the bankruptcy of Silmarils, the three founders André and Louis-Marie Rocques and Pascal Einsweiler are specializing in political strategy games.

Games

References

Video game companies established in 2004
Video game companies of France